Islam is the state-religion in Oman. The country is  95% Muslim. 45% of the Muslim population of Oman follow Sunni Islam and 45% follow Ibadi Islam, while 5% identify as Shia Muslims. Islam spread to Oman in the early years.

History 
The Ibadi denomination established itself in the region after fleeing from Basra in modern-day Iraq.

Christians and Jews have historically been able to practice their own religions openly in Oman. The society is tolerant, though social hierarchies do exist. In Ibadi communities, the traditional Arab coffee is served to Muslims first, with Christians being served after the poor Muslims;  in Sunni communities, Christian guests may actually be served even before the respected Muslim leaders and clerics.

Denominations

Ibadism 
Many people believe that Ibadism is an outgrowth of the Kharijites movement, a variant form of Islam practiced by descendants of a sect that seceded from the principal Muslim body after the death of Muhammad in 632. Ibadies, however, deny this notion considering themselves an outgrowth [led by?] the follower (tabe'e) [[and assert that leadership of Islam should be designated by an imam elected by the community from candidates who possess the appropriate spiritual and personal qualities. Ibadhi leadership is vested in an imam, who is regarded as the sole legitimate leader and combines religious and political authority. The imam is elected by a council of prominent laymen or shaykhs.  Adherence to Ibadism accounts in part for Oman's historical isolation.  Ibadis were not inclined to integrate with their neighbours, as the majority of Sunni Muslims regard Ibadism as a heretical faith.

The austere, puritanical nature of Ibadism has affected the practice of Islam in the country. Omani mosques are very simple, with almost no decoration except around the windows and often lack the minarets common in other Muslim countries. Moroccan explorer Ibn Battuta described the cleanliness of Omani mosques, despite the fact that the entire community would congregate to eat inside, each person bringing their own food. The denomination frowns upon singing and dancing.

Shi'ism
The Shi'as live along Al Batinah and Muscat coasts. There are at least seven Twelver Shia mosques in Muscat. In November, 2022 the largest Shia mosque in the country has been opened in Muscat. It has been built on a 30,000 square meter plot of land and with its building area measuring 12,820 square meters. The construction was ordered by the Ministry of Endowments and Religious Affairs (Oman) and inauguration was attended by Mohammed Saeed Al-Ma’amari, its minister.

Sunnism
In the 1800s, the Jalan Bani Bu Ali tribe converted to Wahhabism. They sporadically fought Ibadi communities but otherwise did not affect the overall religious demographics of Oman.

See also

 Freedom of religion in Oman
 Demographics of Oman

References

Citations

External links

Omani Ministry of Foreign Affairs